Guzmango District is one of eight districts of Contumazá Province in Peru.

References